Charlotte Cholevová (born 29 July 2002) is a Czech handballer for DHK Baník Most and the Czech national team.

She participated at the 2021 World Women's Handball Championship in Spain, placing 19th.

Achievements
Czech First Division:
Winner: 2021

References

External links

2002 births
Living people
Sportspeople from Most (city)
Czech female handball players
21st-century Czech women